Mount Medina is a prominent ice-covered mountain which rises to  from the northeastern part of Hadley Upland and overlooks the head of Gibbs Glacier in southern Graham Land, Antarctica. It was photographed by the Ronne Antarctic Research Expedition in November 1947 (trimetrogon air photography), and was surveyed by the Falkland Islands Dependencies Survey in 1958. The mountain was named by the UK Antarctic Place-Names Committee after Pedro de Medina (1493–1567), Spanish Cosmographer Royal, who wrote Arte de Navegar (Valladolid, 1545), an important manual of navigation.

References

Mountains of Graham Land
Fallières Coast